Dereza is a 1985 Soviet animated musical film by Alexander Davydov. This cartoon was created by Soyuzmultfilm studio. The film received national and international recognition.

Plot summary 
The plot is based on a Russian folk tale. The cartoon follows a goat, Dereza, who is talented but lazy. Dereza prefers idleness, pretending to be unhappy and hungry. Using the protection of a grandfather who believes her, she loses sense of proportion and is thrown out of the house. The goat later repents.

Creators

References

External links
Dereza at Animator.ru

1985 films
1980s musical films
1985 animated films
Animated musical films
Soviet animated films
Soviet musical films
Soyuzmultfilm